(Latin , for "you also") is a discussion technique that intends to discredit the opponent's argument by attacking the opponent's own personal behavior and actions as being inconsistent with their argument, therefore accusing hypocrisy. This specious reasoning is a special type of  attack. The  cites John Cooke's 1614 stage play  as the earliest use of the term in the English language. "Whataboutism" is one particularly well-known modern instance of this technique.

Form and explanation 
The (fallacious)  argument follows the template (i.e. pattern):
 Person A claims that statement  is true.
 Person B asserts that A's actions or past claims are inconsistent with the truth of claim .
 Therefore,  is false.

As a specific example, consider the following scenario where Person A and Person B just left a store. 
Person A: "You took that item without paying for it. What you did is morally wrong!"
Here,  is the statement: "Stealing from a store is morally wrong." Person A is asserting that statement  is true.
Person B: "So what? I remember when you once did the same thing. You didn't think it was wrong and neither is this."
Person B claims that Person A is a hypocrite because Person A once committed this same action. 
Person B has argued that because Person A is a hypocrite, he does not have a right to pass sentences on others before judging himself.

Other artificial examples 

The example above was worded in a way to make it amenable to the template given above. However, in colloquial language, the  technique more often makes an appearance in more subtle and less explicit ways, such as in the following example in which Person B is driving a car with Person A as a passenger:
Person A: "Stop running so many stop signs."
Person B: "You run them all the time!"
Although neither Person A nor Person B explicitly state what  is, because of the colloquial nature of the conversation, it is nevertheless understood that statement  is something like: "Running stop signs is wrong" or some other statement that is similar in spirit.

Person A and/or Person B are also allowed to be groups of individuals (e.g. organizations, such as corporations, governments, or political parties) rather than individual people. For example, Persons A and B might be governments such as those of the United States and the former Soviet Union, which is the situation that led to the term "whataboutism" with the "And you are lynching Negroes" argument. 

The  technique can also appear outside of conversations. For example, it is possible for someone who supports a certain Politician B, who recently did something wrong, to justify not changing their support to another politician by reasoning with themselves:
"Yes, Politician B did do this-or-that immoral thing, but then again so do other politicians. So what's the big deal?"
In this example, Person B was "Politician B" while Person A was "other politicians."

See also 

 Accusation in a mirror
 Clean hands
 False equivalence
 In pari delicto
 List of fallacies
 List of Latin phrases
 Psychological projection
 The pot calling the kettle black
 Two wrongs make a right
 Victor's justice
 people who live in glass houses shouldn't throw stones
 Matthew 7:5

Notes

References

Further reading

External links 

Tu quoque fallacy – Internet Encyclopedia of Philosophy

Latin words and phrases
Latin philosophical phrases
Latin logical phrases
Relevance fallacies

bg:Ad hominem#Ти също (tu quoque)
fr:Argumentum ad hominem#Tu quoque